The following is a list of episodes of the anime television series Tsurupika Hagemaru.

Episodes

Special Episodes

Tsurupika Hagemaru